Mohammad Mehdi Mofatteh is an Iranian conservative politician who has represented Hamedan Province constituencies in the Parliament of Iran.

References

1956 births
Living people
People from Qom
People from Hamadan Province
Members of the 4th Islamic Consultative Assembly
Members of the 5th Islamic Consultative Assembly
Members of the 7th Islamic Consultative Assembly
Members of the 8th Islamic Consultative Assembly
Members of the 9th Islamic Consultative Assembly
Members of the 10th Islamic Consultative Assembly
Alliance of Builders of Islamic Iran politicians
Islamic Society of Engineers politicians
Iranian elected officials who did not take office
Popular Front of Islamic Revolution Forces politicians
Iranian industrial engineers
Tehran Councillors 2013–2017